Omphalotus is a genus of basidiomycete mushroom, in the family  Marasmiaceae, formally circumscribed by Victor Fayod in 1889. Members have the traditional cap and stem structure. They are saprobic, and fruit in clumps on the ground, adjacent to host trees. The best known and type species is the jack-o'-lantern mushroom (Omphalotus olearius).  Species of Omphalotus have been mistaken for chanterelles. All Omphalotus species are presumed poisonous, causing gastrointestinal symptoms. Some Omphalotus species have bioluminescent properties.

Taxonomy
Victor Fayod originally erected the genus with Pleurotus olearius and P. eryngii as its principal species in 1889, placing it in a tribus ("alliance") with the genera Pleurotus and Pleurotellus.

The relationships of the genus have become clearer with genetic analysis. Rolf Singer placed it and the related Lampteromyces in the Boletales due to the presence of the pigment variegatic acid. More specifically the genera were placed in the family Paxillaceae. However, it was found that fungi of the genus Omphalotus break down lignin while those of the genus Paxillus break down cellulose.

Since then, the genera have been found to have a close relationship with the genus Nothopanus, and the whole group to lie within the agaric family Marasmiaceae. The group has been classified in their own family Omphalotaceae.

The type species is the jack-o'-lantern mushroom (Omphalotus olearius) from Europe. Another eight species have been described. The seven species examined genetically form two clades. One is an illudens clade containing (O. illudens) of Europe and North America, and (O. mexicanus) from Central America. The other is an olearius clade containing O. olearius and the tsukiyotake (O. japonicus) from eastern Asia as sister species, and the western jack-o'-lantern (O. olivascens) and (O. subilludens). Since the phylogeny was published, Omphalotus flagelliformis has been described from Yunnan Province in China, which is related to O. mexicanus and O. illudens.

The generic name Omphalotus is derived from the Byzantine Greek ὀμϕαλοειδής, meaning "navel".

Phylogeny

Species

Description
Fungi of this genus produce fleshy mushrooms with smooth or fibrous caps with gills and fleshy or fibrous stems growing in clumps on wood. O. mexicanus has dark blue fruiting bodies tinted with yellow.

Toxicity
Many members of the genus are known to be toxic, with consumption leading to gastrointestinal symptoms of nausea, vomiting and at times diarrhea. The toxic ingredient is a sesquiterpene compound known as illudin S.

Distribution and ecology
The genus has a cosmopolitan distribution, found in forests around the world. Its species cause a white soft rot on dead wood as they break down lignin.

See also 

 List of Marasmiaceae genera
 List of bioluminescent fungi

References

External links 

 MushroomExpert.com
 Blog - Mycology

 
Agaricales genera